Yeşilöz is a village in the Batman District of Batman Province in Turkey. The village is populated by Kurds of the Bekiran and Reşkotan tribes and had a population of 141 in 2021.

References 

Villages in Batman District
Kurdish settlements in Batman Province